The Walter House near Melbourne, Kentucky was built in c. 1869.

The house has a five bay I-house plan.

In March 1983 it was determined eligible for National Register listing but was not listed due to owner objection.

It was listed on the National Register of Historic Places in 2007.

References

National Register of Historic Places in Campbell County, Kentucky
Houses completed in 1869
I-houses in Kentucky
Houses in Campbell County, Kentucky
Houses on the National Register of Historic Places in Kentucky
1869 establishments in Kentucky